Sir Henry Lovell Goldsworthy Gurney  (27 June 1898 – 6 October 1951) was a British colonial administrator who served in various posts throughout the British Empire. Gurney was killed by communist insurgents during the Malayan Emergency, while serving as high commissioner in the Federation of Malaya.

Career
As a boy, Gurney was educated at Winchester College. During World War I, he joined the British Army, and served with the King's Royal Rifle Corps from 1917 to 1920. 

After a brief spell at University College, Oxford, he joined the British Colonial Service in 1921, and was posted to Kenya as an assistant district commissioner. In 1935, after fourteen years in Kenya, he was appointed Assistant Colonial Secretary to Jamaica. After a brief stint working at the Colonial Office in London, Gurney served as Chief Secretary to the Conference of East Africa Governors from 1938 to 1944, and Colonial Secretary in the Gold Coast from 1944 to 1946. In 1946, he was appointed Chief Secretary to Palestine, serving until the end of British rule there in 1948. While serving in Palestine, Gurney was instrumental in crafting British policy during the Jewish insurgency in Palestine.

In the 1947 New Year Honours, he was promoted to Knight Commander of the Order of St Michael and St George, which is the second highest rank in this order – for his service in Palestine. He had previously been a Companion (CMG) in the same order. In 1949 he was made a Knight of the Venerable Order of Saint John.

On 1 October 1948, Gurney was appointed High Commissioner to Malaya. Gurney assumed his post as the Malayan Emergency was beginning, and over the next three years he became the chief architect of British policy in Malaya.

Assassination

On 6 October 1951, Gurney was killed in an ambush by communist insurgents from the Malayan Communist Party while on his way to a resort at Mile 56 ½, Kuala Kubu Road near Fraser's Hill. According to Communist leader Chin Peng, the ambush was routine, the killing by chance, and the guerrillas only learned the High Commissioner was among the dead from news reports.

Gurney's funeral took place on 8 October. He was buried in Cheras War Cemetery in Kuala Lumpur, in a ceremony that drew thousands of people.

Honours

Although Gurney was knighted by King George VI, Malayans from all classes and nationalities, having already given him their esteem and affection, kept his memory green, and when he died on 6 October 1951 they would mourn him as a friend who "has gone home to the mercy of God". At that moment, his funeral was not only attended by his family members and British Officers in Malaya but also attended by the Malayans from all classes and races. Today, Gurney Road in Malacca, Seremban, Kuala Lumpur and Singapore are named after him. The town named Pekan Gurney in Perak is also named after him. The popular beachfront Gurney Drive, in Penang, is also named after him, as well as the Henry Gurney Prisoners School in Teluk Mas, Melaka. Gurney was buried at Cheras War Cemetery in Kuala Lumpur, Malaysia.

His tombstone (shown on the right) is inscribed:

References

Colonial Administrative Service officers
High Commissioners of the United Kingdom to Malaysia
History of Pahang
British Army personnel of World War I
British people of the Malayan Emergency
Knights Bachelor
Knights Commander of the Order of St Michael and St George
Alumni of University College, Oxford
People educated at Winchester College
People from Bude
1898 births
1951 deaths
King's Royal Rifle Corps officers
Assassinated British diplomats
People murdered in Malaysia
Assassinated Malaysian politicians
Deaths by firearm in Malaysia
Chief Secretaries of the Gold Coast (British colony)
Chief Secretaries of Palestine
20th-century British diplomats
1951 murders in Asia
Burials at Cheras War Cemetery